Boost is a brand of chocolate bar manufactured by Cadbury. The bar is sold in the United Kingdom, Ireland, Australia, New Zealand and South Africa.  It consists of milk chocolate with a caramel and biscuit filling.

History
Boost was introduced in the UK in 1985 as Coconut Boost, a coconut and caramel bar coated in chocolate. In 1989 the peanut and caramel Starbar was rebranded as Peanut Boost. A biscuit and caramel version was also launched. The coconut bar was discontinued in 1994 and the peanut version was again rebranded as Starbar. The biscuit version is now the standard Boost bar.

An energy version, Boost Guarana, was launched in the UK in 2002 along with Boost Glucose. Both were marketed with the slogan "gives you the edge".

In 2009, the Boost packaging was redesigned and the Boost Duo was also launched: two smaller Boost bars in one wrapper. Cadbury Boost Bites, bitesize bars sold in a 108g bag, were introduced in August 2015.

Boost+ Protein was introduced in 2018 containing caramel, "protein crisps", and less sugar than the standard bar. In 2019 a peanut version of this was also released.

Boost was the most popular snack among construction workers working on the 2012 London Olympics.

Following increased commodity prices and legislation from the Government, the Boost bar in the United Kingdom was shrunk from 60g down to 48.5g in 2013. In 2014, the Boost Duo version also shrank by 10g to 68g. The wrapper was notably updated to reflect the new Reference Intakes and use of Palm and Shea fat in the product. 
The boost Duo has shrunk yet again to 63g which is only 3g more than the original bar from 1985.

Marketing 
In the 1990s Boost was advertised on television by comedy duo Reeves and Mortimer with the unconventional advertising slogan "It's slightly rippled with a flat under-side." Cadbury's Boost then went on to sponsor the successful Yamaha team in the British Superbike Championship. It has also been marketed using the slogan "charged with glucose".

References

External links
 

Cadbury brands
Mondelez International brands
Chocolate bars
Australian confectionery
Products introduced in 1985